These are the official results of the Men's 50 km Walk event at the 1987 World Championships in Rome, Italy. The race was held on Saturday September 5, 1987.

Medalists

Abbreviations
All times shown are in hours:minutes:seconds

Records
Existing records at the start of the event.

Final

See also
 1978 Men's European Championships 50km Walk (Prague)
 1980 Men's Olympic 50km Walk (Moscow)
 1982 Men's European Championships 50km Walk (Athens)
 1984 Men's Olympic 50km Walk (Los Angeles)
 1986 Men's European Championships 50km Walk (Stuttgart)
 1987 Race Walking Year Ranking
 1988 Men's Olympic 50km Walk (Seoul)
 1990 Men's European Championships 50km Walk (Split)

References
 Results

W
Racewalking at the World Athletics Championships